The Iraqi Intifada (Arabic: انتفاضة العراق) was a series of national strikes and violent protests against the ruling Hashemite monarchy and the Anglo-Iraqi Treaty. Inspired by the Egyptian Revolution and Iranian Prime Minister Mohammad Mosaddegh's nationalization of oil, the revolutionaries wanted to force Faisal II's abdication, transform the state into a republic, and assert Iraq's full independence from Britain by assuming control over its own foreign affairs.

Port workers in Basra went on strike on 23 August 1952. Students at Iraq's College of Pharmacy followed suit on 26 October. The Iraqi Communist Party, which had been behind the 1948 riots, played a leading role in the disturbances. Though the protesters were emphatically anti-monarchical, they were positively disposed to the military, a symbol of national unity and Iraqi independence. Faisal II's uncle, ruling Regent 'Abd al-Ilah, replaced Mustafa Mahmud al-Umari with General Nureddin Mahmud on 23 November but he made no concessions to the protesters. Protesters denounced Mahmud and demanded his resignation in favor of the National Democratic Party's Kamil al-Chadirchi, who had briefly served as Bakr Sidqi's Economic Minister after the 1936 revolution. Mahmud cracked down, instituting martial law and a curfew, shutting down political parties and newspapers, and detaining leading protesters. In 1953, Jamil al-Midfai, a civilian politician, was elected to succeed Mahmud. In May, Faisal II became an adult and assumed the role and responsibilities of the king. In 1958, Army officers overthrew the monarchy in a coup d'état, murdering the royal family.

References

1952 in Iraq
1952 protests
Arab rebellions in Iraq
Conflicts in 1952
Intifadas
Protests in Iraq